Lords Beach is a suburban beach along the River Derwent in Sandy Bay, Hobart, Tasmania. The north-east facing beach has views of Wrest Point Hotel Casino, Nutgrove Beach and the City of Clarence on the eastern shore. Containing several raised jetties and covered piers, Lords Beach neighbours Red Chapel Beach to the west and Dunkley’s Point on the east.

History
Named for James Lord, a convict landowner, who lends his name both to the beach and to Lord Street, Sandy Bay.

Lords Beach was once a continuous single beach encompassing neighbouring Red Chapel Beach, Nutgrove Beach and Long Beach. However due to development and erosion of the smalls cliffs on its foreshore, it has become greatly separated from the other beaches.

Marine life
Caused by microscopic plankton, a bioluminescence phenomenon intermittently occurs in the beach's waters in the evening.

Environment
Lords Beach has been greatly forfeited by manmade seawalls in response to harrowing natural elements including strong currents, swells, rain and winds, as well as ecological problems such as erosion from foot traffic and traffic-induced vibrations from vehicles along Sandy Bay Road. The beach has been greatly reduced to a  strip of sand, placed between the Wrest Point seawall, and seawall along Sandy Bay Road. Waves ranging between  create a steep beach scape appearance.

Access
Lords Beach is a 45 minute walk from the Hobart City Centre, or a short metro bus ride along Sandy Bay Road.

Gallery

References

Beaches of Tasmania